Huang Wenyi (born 6 March 1991) is a female Chinese rower.  She is a World and Olympic medallist.

Career 
Huang began to row at the age of 12.  Her mother had been a basketball player.

At the 2012 Summer Olympics, she and Xu Dongxiang won the silver medal in the women's lightweight double sculls.  Two years later, the team of Huang and Pan Dandan won the bronze medal at the 2014 World Championship, again in the women's lightweight double sculls.  Huang won her second Olympic medal in 2016, winning women's lightweight double sculls bronze with Pan Feihong.

References

 

1991 births
Living people
Chinese female rowers
Olympic rowers of China
Olympic silver medalists for China
Olympic bronze medalists for China
Olympic medalists in rowing
Medalists at the 2012 Summer Olympics
Medalists at the 2016 Summer Olympics
Rowers at the 2012 Summer Olympics
Rowers at the 2016 Summer Olympics
Asian Games medalists in rowing
Rowers at the 2010 Asian Games
Rowers at the 2014 Asian Games
World Rowing Championships medalists for China
Asian Games gold medalists for China
Medalists at the 2010 Asian Games
Medalists at the 2014 Asian Games
Rowers from Guangdong
People from Chaoyang District, Shantou
20th-century Chinese women
21st-century Chinese women